Twin Falls is a waterfall in the western United States, on the Snake River in the Snake River Canyon of south-central Idaho. The falls are located on the border of Jerome and Twin Falls counties, a few miles east of its namesake city, Twin Falls. They are upstream (east) of Pillar Falls and Shoshone Falls and just downstream from Milner Dam.

Water flows westward over Twin Falls and is controlled by the Twin Falls Dam, built in the 1930s and used for irrigation and hydroelectric power generation. There were originally two parallel falls, but the dam permanently diverted the flow from the southern falls, leaving a single (north) waterfall.

Before the dam, very high flow rates could result in a smaller third falls, to the south.

See also

List of waterfalls in Idaho
List of rivers of Idaho
List of lakes of Idaho

References

External links

Visit Southern Idaho - Waterfalls

Landforms of Jerome County, Idaho
Snake River
Landforms of Twin Falls County, Idaho
Waterfalls of Idaho
Block waterfalls